Afghanistan National Unity Cup is a football tournament that was hosted by the city of Herat in 2008. The tournament involved eight teams from across Afghanistan.

Matches

Group stage

Group A
The four teams in this group were Ansari Herat F.C. and Abumoslem Herat F.C. from Herat, Mazarsharif XI from Mazar-i-Sharif and Nimruz XI from Nimruz.

 Abumoslem Herat F.C. 4–1 Nimruz XI
 Abumoslem Herat F.C. 1–1 Ansari Herat F.C.
 Abumoslem Herat F.C. 0–1 Mazarsharif XI
 Ansari Herat F.C. 3–2 Nimruz XI
 Ansari Herat F.C. 1–0 Mazarsharif XI
 Mazarsharif XI 6–1 Nimruz XI

Group B
The four teams in this group were Esteghlal Herat F.C. and Eteffaq Herat F.C. from Herat, Jalalabad XI from Jalalabad and Kabul Bank F.C. from Kabul.

 Esteghlal Herat F.C. 1–0 Kabul Bank F.C.
 Esteghlal Herat F.C. 3–1 Jalalabad XI
 Esteghlal Herat F.C. 1–0 Eteffaq Herat F.C.
 Kabul Bank F.C. 5–1 Jalalabad XI
 Kabul Bank F.C. 3–1 Eteffaq Herat F.C.
 Jalalabad XI 1–3 Eteffaq Herat F.C.

Semi-final
 Kabul Bank F.C. 1–0 Ansari Herat F.C.
 Esteghlal Herat F.C. 1–0 Mazarsharif XI

Third-place match
 Ansari Herat F.C. 4–2 Mazarsharif XI

Final
 Esteghlal Herat F.C. 1–0 Kabul Bank F.C.

Top scorers
1. Jalal Afshar from Ansari Herat F.C. 5 Goals

References
  http://www.heratcity.org/sport/melli.htm

Afghanistan
Unity
Football competitions in Afghanistan